The China University of Geosciences (Beijing) (abbreviated CUGB or 北京地大) is a key national university directly under the administration of the Education Ministry of the People's Republic of China. It is located in Haidian District in Beijing. It is a Chinese state Double First Class University Plan university identified by the Ministry of Education of China.

Campus 
The China University of Geosciences (Beijing) is located in the original campus of former Beijing Institute of Geology, Xueyuan Road, with a concentration of 8 famous universities and academic tradition.

History

1952–1970: creation
In 1952, Beijing Institute of Geology was founded as a result of the merger of the geological departments from Peking University, Tsinghua University, Tianjin University, and Tangshan Railway College.  It was among China's first 16 key universities back in the 1950s.

1970–1978: re-location
The university suspended operations from 1966–1970 due to the Cultural Revolution, and reopened in Jiangling County, Hubei Province, in 1970 as Hubei College of Geology. In 1975, the campus was moved to Wuhan, and the school was renamed Wuhan College of Geology.

1978–1987: reconstruction
In 1978, the graduate faculties relocated in Beijing under the support of Mr. Deng Xiaoping, the leader of the People’s Republic of China. In 1986, the Beijing Graduate School of Wuhan College of Geology was founded in the original campus of former Beijing Institute of Geology, Beijing.

1987–2005: revitalization
In 1987, Wuhan College of Geology was renamed China University of Geosciences. The China University of Geosciences has two campuses in Beijing and Wuhan respectively, both of which have independent legal personalities. In 1997, CUGB was approved as one of key universities construction of the  211 project. In February 2000, CUGB was put under the management of the Ministry of Education.

2005–present: independence
In March 2005, CUGB and China University of Geosciences (CUG, Wuhan) became independent educational entities. In September 2006, CUGB was established as a joint responsibility of the Ministry of Education and the Ministry of Land and Resources. At the same year, CUGB was approved  included in the 985 Project Innovation Platform. CUGB is included in the Chinese state Double First Class University Plan.

Key Disciplines

First class national key disciplines
Geology
Geo-resources and Geo-engineering

Second class state key disciplines
Geochemistry
Paleontology and Stratigraphy	
Mineralogy, Petrology, Mineral Deposit Geology
Geological Engineering
Mineral Resource Prospecting and Exploration
Structural Geology

State Key Laboratory 
State Key Laboratory of Geological Processes and Mineral Resources

Image gallery

Alumni
 Li Zhixin, Chinese mountaineer
 Ouyang Ziyuan, chief scientist of Chinese Lunar Project
 Wen Jiabao, former Premier of the State Council of the People's Republic of China

See also
China University of Geosciences (Wuhan)
Geology of China
Wen Jiabao
Double First Class University Plan
Project 211
List of colleges and universities

References

External links
 Home Page of CUGB in Chinese

Project 211
Plan 111
Educational institutions established in 1952
1952 establishments in China
Universities and colleges in Haidian District
Geology of China
Geology education
Beijing
Universities established in the 1950s